The following lists events that happened during 1956 in Singapore.

Incumbents
 Governor: Sir Robert Brown Black
 Chief Minister: 
 David Marshall (until June 7)
Lim Yew Hock (from June 8)
 Chief Secretary: Sir William Goode

Events

March
 15 March - Nanyang University is officiated with a flag-raising ceremony, with classes beginning on 30 March.

April
 23 April - The first Merdeka talks were held, which failed on 23 May after failing to compromise on internal security arrangements. As a result, David Marshall resigned.

June
 8 June - Lim Yew Hock became the second Chief Minister of Singapore.

August
 17 August - The Nicoll Highway and Merdeka Bridge are officially opened.

October
 10 October - Protests by students occurred after several organisations were dissolved over communist links. The protests continued over two weeks, culminating into riots that occurred on 25 October.

Births
 23 July - Iskandar Ismail - Musician, winner of 2008 Cultural Medallion in Music (d. 2014).
 12 September - Walter Woon - Former Nominated Member of Parliament.
 1 October - Chan Soo Sen - Former politician.

See also
List of years in Singapore

References

 
Singapore
Years in Singapore